Assinie-Mafia is a coastal resort town in south-eastern Ivory Coast. It is a sub-prefecture of Adiaké Department in Sud-Comoé Region, Comoé District.

Geography
Assinie-Mafia is located 80 kilometres east of Abidjan along the coast of the Gulf of Guinea. Access to the area is by road A100 going east from Abidjan then turning right to the B-107 road (Route Assinie) then Route Assinie-Mafia along the coast. The road ends at Assinie-Mafia. Assinie-Mafia is a long narrow settlement along the coast on both sides of the outlet of Aby Lagoon.

Assinie-Mafia was a commune until March 2012, when it became one of 1126 communes nationwide that were abolished.

The Assinie area starts at the location of the Paul-Emile Durand cottage in the west bordered to the south by the ocean and accessible by the Assinie-Mafia road. Opposite the town of Assinie-Mafia is a narrow peninsula (from 100m to 1000m wide) extending from the west and 15 km long which is occupied by luxury villas and huts. Access is by car, private boats, or canoes across the lagoon.

The mouth of the lagoon which marks the end of the Assinie-Mafia peninsula is called La Passe where the high-rise resort and the smoking of tchoukourou is very popular.

The area is a favourite destination for wealthy inhabitants of Abidjan for the weekend.

Assinie-Mafia was the location of the film French Fried Vacation (Les Bronzés) in 1978.

In 2014, the population of the sub-prefecture of Assinie-Mafia was 16,721.

Villages
The eight villages of the sub-prefecture of Assinie-Mafia and their population in 2014 are:

 Assinie-France  (1 729)
 Assinie-Mafia  (5 661)
 Assinie-Sagbadou  (1 014)
 Assouindé  (5 766)
 Ebotiam  (489)
 Essankro  (595)
 Mabianéha  (841)
 Mandjian  (626)

History

Assinie (formerly Issiny) was the first trading post on the Eburnean coast although no vestige of that time remains today. In 1637 five Capuchin missionaries, who came from Saint-Malo, settled there. Climate and sickness caused them to leave quickly and one died there.

King of Assinie
In 1687, two years after the implementation of the Code noir, missionaries and French traders settled at Assinie at the eastern end of the coast towards the Gold Coast. However, they left in 1705 after having built and occupied Fort Saint-Louis from 1701 to 1704, as the slave trade did not earn enough as compared to the farming of grain. Among them were the Knight of Amon and Admiral Jean-Baptiste du Casse, director of the Compagnie du Sénégal, who were interested in the gold traffic and were received at the court of King Zena. They took the young Prince Aniaba and his cousin Banga to France, where they were presented to King Louis XIV and converted to Catholicism (Aniaba was baptized by Bossuet, Bishop of Meaux). They became officers in the Régiment du Roi (Regiment of the King) before returning to Issiny in 1700. In 1704, Aniaba became counselor to the King of Quita (now Togo), who called himself Hannibal.

Development
The first sustainable fort on the Coast after Fort Saint-Louis from 1701 to 1704 was Fort Joinville in Grand-Bassam which was built there in 1843 after the landing of ship's lieutenants Kerhallet and Fleuriot de Langle which led to a treaty between France and the King of Krinjabo, Amon Ndoufou. At that time skirmishes with the English were frequent and prevented operations in the interior of the country. It is inside these forts that the first trading posts were established in the next few years.

An inspection of the fortified trading post at Assini in 1850 mentioned: "order and cleanliness reign within its walls", the existence of a bastion of masonry (four were originally planned), and the presence of small artillery equivalent to that at Grand-Bassam. "The trading post personnel consist of 40 people, including 5 Europeans, 20 soldiers, and 15 boatmen, coolies, and others and they are in a satisfactory state of health". The men "are in a better place to live [than at Grand-Bassam], where resources are greater because of more frequent intercourse with the natives and are removed from that product of fatigue for the body and sight an existence almost continually passed on moving bleached sand, roasted by a burning sun" The Ivorian postal service began in this locality on 29 July 1843.

The French penetration of the region was counteracted by yellow fever epidemics (in 1857 of 50 Europeans in the three trading posts of Assinie, Grand-Bassam and Dabou, 32 died and 10 were repatriated) and British competition (Victor Régis, pioneer of French trade on this coast since 1843, had to close shop in the early 1860s). However, the first Post Office opened on 17 August 1862.

Arthur Verdier was the first to really bring value to the Assinie region from 1870. The first coffee trees were planted in 1881 and at the same time the cultivation of cocoa started. Logging began in 1885.

The decline
Assinie was the third largest port in Ivory Coast in 1907 but it quickly lost all commercial and strategic importance in favour of Grand-Bassam, then Bingerville, and finally Port-Bouët/Abidjan.

Education
The first official French school was created at Elima on 8 August 1887 with teacher Fritz-Emile Jeand'heur from Algeria. He had 33 African students who became the first French-language readers. The school ran for three years before being transferred to Assinie-Mafia in 1890 by Marcel Treich-Laplène, the new resident from France.

Sports
Assinie-Mafia has a football club, ASCI d'Assinie, which plays in the regional championship division, equivalent to "4th division". As in most towns in the country, it is informally organized with football tournaments of seven players which are very popular in Ivory Coast and called Maracanas.

Notes

References
Georges Courrèges, Grand Bassam and the trading posts on the coast: Assinie, Jacqueville, Grand Lahou, Fresco, Sassandra, San Pedro, L'Instant Durable, Clermont-Ferrand, 1987, 84 p. (G. Courrèges was the Director of the Institut culturel de l'Ambassade de France) 
Guy Cangah and Simon-Pierre Ekanza, The Ivory Coast by the texts, Nouvelles éditions africaines, 1978  
François Joseph Clozel, Ten years on the Ivory Coast, Paris, 1906 
R. Mouezy, Assinie and the Kingdom of Krinjabo, Paris, 1942  
Henriette Diabaté, Aniaba, an Assinian at the court of Louis XIV, Nouvelles éditions africaines, 1975,  
Anoma Kanié, Prince of Assinie, drama in 3 acts 

Sub-prefectures of Sud-Comoé
Former communes of Ivory Coast